The 2010-11 Kyrgyzstan Championship was the fourth edition of the Kyrgyzstan Championship. Gornyak Ak-Tuz won the championship by defeating Khan-Tengri Bishkek in the playoff final.

First round

Group A
Khan-Tengri Bishkek - Cholpon-Ata Issuk-Kul 11:1
Cholpon-Ata Issyk-Kul - Arstan Shumkar Bishkek 9:2
Khan-Tengri Bishkek - Arstan Shumkar Bishkek 4:3

Group B
Gornyak Ak-Tuz - Dorodi Ala-Too Naryn 6:3
Chaek Zhumgal - Dorodi Ala-Too Naryn 4:2
Gornyak Ak-Tuz - Chaek Zhumgal 0:0

Playoffs

Semifinals
Gornyak Ak-Tuz - Arstan Shumkar Bishkek 11:3
Khan-Tengri Bishkek - Chaek Zhumgal 5:0

Final
Gornyak Ak-Tuz - Khan-Tengri Bishkek 15:2

External links
Season on eurohockey.com

Kyrgyzstan